Glen Douglas is a glen in the southwest Scottish Highlands. It is drained by the Douglas Water, which discharges at the village of Inverbeg at its eastern end into Loch Lomond. The glen is followed by a single-track road which links the A82 road alongside Loch Lomond with the A814 road beside Loch Long. The glen is overlooked to the north by Beinn Bhreac and Tullich Hill and to the south by Doune Hill and a  hill known as Coire na h-Eanachan.

At the upper (western) end of the glen is the DM Glen Douglas military munitions depot which is connected to the railway line from Helensburgh to Crianlarich at the site of the old station. 
Glen Douglas has 3 farms two of which are still in use and both are named after hills in the Glen - Doune farm and Tullich Farm.

See also
Glen Douglas Halt railway station

References

Glens of Scotland
Valleys of Argyll and Bute